Raymond Adelphia Benge (April 22, 1902 – June 27, 1997) was a pitcher for the Cleveland Indians (1925–26), Philadelphia Phillies (1928–32 and 1936), Brooklyn Dodgers (1933–35), Boston Bees (1936) and Cincinnati Reds (1938). He led the National League in home runs allowed (24) and earned runs allowed (139) in 1929.

In 12 seasons Benge had a 101–130 win–loss record, 346 games (249 started), 102 complete games, 12 shutouts, 65 games finished, 19 saves, 1,875 innings pitched, 2,177 hits allowed, 1,108 runs allowed, 941 earned runs allowed, 132 home runs allowed, 598 walks, 655 strikeouts, 30 hit batsmen, 14 wild pitches, 8,278 batters faced and a 4.52 ERA.

Benge served in the US Navy during World War II. He died in Centerville, Texas, at the age of 95.

References

External links

1902 births
1997 deaths
Baseball players from Texas
Major League Baseball pitchers
Cleveland Indians players
Philadelphia Phillies players
Brooklyn Dodgers players
Boston Bees players
Cincinnati Reds players
Houston Buffaloes players
Waco Cubs players
Decatur Commodores players
Sam Houston Bearkats baseball coaches
Sam Houston Bearkats baseball players
Syracuse Chiefs players
Shreveport Sports players
People from Jacksonville, Texas